Jeremy Stanford is an Australian actor and director, known for his role of Tick/Mitzi in the initial stage run of the musical Priscilla, Queen of the Desert.

Filmography

Film

Television

Stage performances
Buddy – The Buddy Holly Story as Buddy Holly, New Zealand (1993) 
Priscilla, Queen of the Desert as Tick/Mitzi (2006 - 2008)

Bibliography
Year of the Queen (2007)

References

External links
 

Australian male actors
Year of birth missing (living people)
Living people